Late Imperial China, formerly Ch'ing-shih wen-t'i (清史問題) until 1984, is a peer-reviewed academic journal established in 1965. It specializes in research on the Ming and Qing dynasties. The journal includes methodologically novel techniques in the study of political, intellectual, social, and gender history as well as historical demography. Articles include a Chinese glossary. The journal is published biannually by the Johns Hopkins University Press since 1993.

Abstracting and indexing
This journal is abstracted and indexed in the following databases:
 Arts & Humanities Citation Index
 Current Contents
 Web of Science
 Scopus
 De Gruyter Saur databases
 EBSCOhost databases
 PubMed
 ProQuest databases

See also

Journal of Song-Yuan Studies

References

External links 
 

Publications established in 1981
Chinese history journals
Biannual journals
English-language journals
Johns Hopkins University Press academic journals